Miory District is a second-level administrative subdivision (raion) of Belarus in the Vitebsk Region.

Notable residents 
 Ceslaus Sipovich (1914 – October 4, 1981), bishop of the Belarusian Greek Catholic Church and a notable Belarusian émigré social and religious leader.

References

 
Districts of Vitebsk Region